Vyacheslav Seluyanov (born December 15, 1986) is a Russian professional ice hockey defenceman currently playing for Gornyak Rudny of the Kazakhstan Hockey Championship. He is the younger brother of Alexander Seluyanov.

Seluyanov previously played in the Russian Superleague and Kontinental Hockey League for Salavat Yulaev Ufa, HC Lada Togliatti and Avtomobilist Yekaterinburg.

References

External links

1986 births
Living people
Avtomobilist Yekaterinburg players
Beibarys Atyrau players
HK Dukla Michalovce players
Gornyak Rudny players
HC Lada Togliatti players
Molot-Prikamye Perm players
Russian ice hockey defencemen
Salavat Yulaev Ufa players
Saryarka Karagandy players
Sokol Krasnoyarsk players
Sportspeople from Ufa
Sputnik Nizhny Tagil players
Toros Neftekamsk players
Yertis Pavlodar players
Yuzhny Ural Orsk players
Russian expatriate sportspeople in Hungary
Russian expatriate sportspeople in Kazakhstan
Russian expatriate sportspeople in Slovakia
Expatriate ice hockey players in Hungary
Expatriate ice hockey players in Kazakhstan
Expatriate ice hockey players in Slovakia
Russian expatriate ice hockey people